The 1998 Auto Trader RAC British Touring Car Championship featured 26 races across 13 rounds, it commenced at Thruxton on 13 April and ended at Silverstone on 20 September.

The championship was won by Rickard Rydell in a Volvo S40, the runner-up was Anthony Reid in a Nissan Primera and James Thompson finished in third driving a Honda Accord. The Autosport Cup for Independents, a championship for privateer entries was won by Tommy Rustad in a Renault Laguna.

The video game TOCA 2 Touring Cars is based on this championship season.

Background 
There were three major rule changes to the championship prior to the start of the 1998 season. Race weekends were changed notably with two different types of races now elected: a shorter "sprint" race and a "feature" race, 25% longer than previous races featuring a mandatory two-tyre stop to be taken between 15 and 75% distance. Qualifying for the sprint race involved drivers holding a "shoot-out" style session where each driver was sent out one of a time and were given a single timed lap to determine their starting position with the slowest driver from feature qualifying going first and fastest going last. Qualifying for the feature race remained the same as the previous season.

Four wheel drive systems were also banned for 1998, a system used notably by 1996 champions Audi.

The independents trophy previously known as the 'Total Cup for Independents' became the 'Autosport Cup for Independents'. The £250,000 prize fund, introduced in 1997, remained in place however at the request of the independent competitors, prize money now will be awarded on the results of each individual round rather than as a lump sum to the top three overall finishers at the end of the season. In 1998, the first independent finisher in each of the 26 rounds will receive £2,500, while second and third past the chequered flag will receive £1,250 and £500 respectively.

Team and driver changes 
Eight manufacturer backed teams contested the championship with no changes to the manufacturer - team line up.

1997 champions Williams Renault, now in their fourth year of partnership in the BTCC, retained their driver line up of Alain Menu and Jason Plato once again driving the Laguna. The familiar yellow and blue livery was replaced by the dark green of new title sponsor Nescafe Blend 37. The team entered a third car for the final round at Silverstone for independents cup winner Tommy Rustad.

Audi were forced to abandon their four-wheel-drive A4 which helped them to the 1996 title for a more conventional front-wheel drive car. 1995 French touring car champion Yvan Muller joined the team after helping German manufacturer develop the new FWD car in the Super Tourenwagen Cup in 1997. He was joined by John Bintcliffe now in his third season with Audi with Frank Biela moving back in to Super Tourenwagen Cup.

Nissan were another team to retain their driver line-up with the experience Scots David Leslie and Anthony Reid racing a pair of RML prepared Primeras. The team entered a third car at Brands Hatch in August for former driver and then Top Gear presenter Tiff Needell. This appeared as a feature on the popular motoring show.

Following a very promising winter test program  Prodrive run Honda retained Yorkshire's James Thompson with ex BMW driver Peter Kox replacing 1994 champion Gabriele Tarquini, who moved to STW to spearhead Honda's assault on the 1998 Super Tourenwagen Cup.

TWR Volvo had also changed their lineup with former Ferrari, Footwork and Sauber  F1 driver Gianni Morbidelli replacing Kelvin Burt, who switched to JTCC, to partner Swede Rickard Rydell who remained with the team for a fifth season.

Vauxhall engineered and run by Triple Eight continued with Derek Warwick and 1995 champion John Cleland racing the Vectra. Following the disaster with aerodynamics in 1997 Triple Eight developed the aero themselves for 1998.

One of the biggest stories going into the season was that Ford had signed 1992 Formula One champion Nigel Mansell to compete in three rounds of the championship. For all other rounds New Zealander Craig Baird, a former works BMW driver in Australia, South Africa and New Zealand, will race alongside 1991 champion Will Hoy, now in his eleventh season of BTCC competition.

Switching from Ford Paul Radisich joined Tim Harvey at Peugeot whose 406's were again run by Motor Sport Developments (MSD).

Alfa Romeo announced that they would make a comeback to the BTCC by entering later rounds of the season. Fabrizio Giovanardi and Nicola Larini were scheduled to drive the new 156 but Alfa's plans fell through, and the team never appeared.

Reigning independents champion Robb Gravett again entered his 1996 Honda Accord now run by Brookes Motorsport. A second car was entered at Oulton Park in September for Lee Brookes but didn't start either race.

Matt Neal raced a 1997 Nissan Primera run by family outfit Team Dynamics.

D.C.Cook Motorsport entered the 1997 championship winning Renault Laguna for Norwegian Tommy Rustad and for the final two meetings they also entered a Honda Accord for Paula Cook.

Mardi Gras Motorsport entered a Honda Accord for Norwegian Roger Moen until team and driver went their separate ways after the Croft rounds. The team took over the running of Mark Lemmer's Vauxhall Vectra for three meetings in the second half of the season after he split with Mint Motorsport who had run the car until Croft.

Season Review 
Menu and Renault’s title defence would not be a happy one. The champion would only win three races all year, and combined with a string of retirements restricted him to only fourth in the standings. The Swiss driver would depart the team at the end of the season. Plato would have a steady season, taking a single victory and finishing directly behind his teammate in the standings.

Menu’s struggles would open the door for Volvo’s Rickard Rydell. A combination of speed and the best consistency of any driver would allow the Swede to claim the drivers title. TWR Volvo would miss out on both the teams and manufacturers championships however, partly due to the lacklustre performances of Morbidelli. The Italian was unable to match his teammate’s pace, in what would turn out to be his only season in Britain.

Nissan would have a breakthrough season. David Leslie would pick up two victories, including the first for the car at Silverstone in April. But the star of the season would be Anthony Reid, picking up eleven pole positions and seven victories, the most of any driver, and allowing Nissan to claim both the manufacturers and teams championships ahead of Volvo and Renault.

Honda’s year would be one of mixed fortunes. James Thompson would have a strong season, winning multiple races for the first time and finishing third in the standings, but teammate Peter Kox was hampered by a string of bad luck and would endure a tough first season in Britain.

Audi’s campaign with their front-wheel-drive car was poor. New team leader Bintcliffe was virtually non-existent all season, whilst British championship rookie Yvan Muller showed glimpses of pace throughout the year, although it was only enough for a handful of podium finishes. The German marque would not return to the series for 1999.

The season would see a mini-renaissance for Vauxhall following a difficult 1997. Both drivers would claim race victories; Cleland would claim two, both at Donington Park, whilst Warwick would claim his in a wet race at Knockhill, before hanging up his driving gloves at the end of the year. Cleland was forced to miss a round due to injury, and was replaced by Brazilian Vectra challenge driver Flavio Figueiredo.

Ford were another team to have a year filled with ups and downs. The car seemed to be at its best in the wet, veteran Will Hoy demonstrating that with a victory at Silverstone. Kiwi Craig Baird was largely disappointing, whilst Nigel Mansell thrilled the crowds by nearly winning in the pouring rain at Donington Park, but would also voice his frustrations regarding the series’ driving standards following an incident-filled round at Brands Hatch.

Despite all the promise surrounding the team, with a strong driver line-up and the car’s success in the German championship, Peugeot would again fail to deliver. Radisich and Harvey could not keep the team off bottom place in the manufacturers race, and the French marque would be another to withdraw from the series come the end of the year.

Entry list 
 

 Despite being on the entry list, the Alfa Romeo team did not contest any races.

Calendar
All races were held in the United Kingdom.

Drivers Championship

No driver may collect more than one "Lead a Lap" point per race no matter how many laps they lead.

Note: bold signifies pole position (1 point awarded all races), italics signifies fastest lap

* signifies that driver lead feature race for at least one lap (1 point given). Note: All bonus leading points may not be added due to them being added after seeing Season Review footage and some race reports.

Note: No points were awarded for leading in the feature race at Knockhill.

Autosport Cup for Independents
 Points were only awarded to the top three class finishers in each race.

Manufacturers Championship

Teams Championship

References

External links 
 BTCC Pages 

British Touring Car Championship seasons
Touring Car Championship